The CANT Z.511 was a four-engine long-range seaplane designed by Filippo Zappata of the "Cantieri Riuniti dell'Adriatico" (CRDA) company. Originally designed for the Central and South Atlantic passenger routes, it was later adapted as a military transport and special raider.

Design and development
The design for the construction of a large four-engine, twin-float seaplane began at the end of September 1937, when the technical department of CRDA accepted the specifications of the LATI (Compagnia Ala Littoria) company, created in 1939, who required a long-range seaplane for carrying mail, cargo and passengers to Latin America.

These plans were cancelled on the outbreak of World War II, but a version of the aircraft was adapted for long-range maritime patrol, armed with 10 single-mount  machine guns in both side gun positions, in two upper turrets, and belly positions. Plans were made to install  cannon in a front turret or in a glazed nose position, and more machine guns in a tail position.

The original engines were relatively underpowered, so Zappata asked the authorities for permission to acquire  Wright R-2600 Double Cyclones from the United States. Due to the deteriorating international situation, however, he was unable to obtain authorization.

Operational history
The Z.511 had its first test flights at Monfalcone, Venezia Giulia (north-eastern Italy) between October 1940 and March 1942. The Z.511 prototype was then transported to Grado, Venezia (further away from the insecure Yugoslavian border) for further evaluations; the last test and operational flight occurred on 1 September 1943, two days before the Italian Armistice was signed.

After the division of the Italian forces, one aircraft was appropriated by the Fascist Aeronautica Nazionale Repubblicana. However, it had been damaged only three weeks before by British fighters, which had strafed it on Lake Trasimeno where it was undergoing final trials. It was transferred to the seaplane base at Vigna di Valle. There it suffered from sabotage by base personnel to prevent it falling into the hands of either the Allies or the Germans. The other aircraft, still under construction at the CRDA factory, was retained by Axis forces and scrapped.

Specifications (Z.511)

See also

Notes

References

 John & Elke Weale, Combat Aircraft of World War Two (pp. 193–205), Arms and Armour Press, London, 1978.
 World War Two Magazine, Article : "Germany, Italy and Japan each had plans to strike the U.S. mainland, but the plans were delayed...too long" by Frank Joseph (pp. 10–20) Published by Empire Press Inc., March 1993.
 Spanish Military Review "Serga", (Historia Militar del Siglo XX), Article "CANT, la oficina aeronautica de la Cantieri Navale Triestino", by Carlo D'Agostino (translated into Spanish by D. Garcia) (pp. 42–48), Almena Ediciones, N 10, March–April 2001.

External links 

 Cantieri Z-511 IdroGigante images

Z.0511
1940s Italian military transport aircraft
Floatplanes
Four-engined tractor aircraft
Low-wing aircraft
Aircraft first flown in 1940
Four-engined piston aircraft